Wester can refer to:

People
 Arvid Wester (1856–1914), Swedish soldier who was active in the service of the Belgians in the Congo
 August Wester (1882–1960), American wrestler
 Curtis Wester (1951–1995) Canadian Football guard 
 Ivar Wester (1892–1967), Swedish sports shooter.
 Jacob Wester (born 1987), Swedish freeskier
 Jennifer Wester, American ice dancer
 Johan Wester, Swedish comedian
 John Charles Wester, American prelate of the Catholic Church
 Keith A. Wester (1940–2002), American sound engineer
 Lina Wester, Swedish ice hockey forward
 Mats Wester (born 1964), Swedish musician
 Oscar Wester (born 1995), Swedish freestyle skier
 Peter Jansen Wester (1887–1931), Swedish-American botanist
 Tess Wester, Dutch handball player
 Travis Wester (born 1977), American actor
 Ulla Wester (born 1953), Swedish politician

Places
 Wester Ross, Scotland
 Wester (river) in North Rhine-Westphalia, Germany

Other
 "Wester", a song from The Art of Drowning (album) by American punk rock band AFI

See also

 
 Westerly (disambiguation)
 Westar (disambiguation)
 West (disambiguation)